Mohamed Azzedine Azzouzi (born 20 September 1947) is an Algerian former middle-distance runner. He represented his nation in the 800 metres and 1500 metres at the 1972 Summer Olympic Games. He won a bronze medal at the 1971 Mediterranean Games in the 800 metres.

References

External links
 

1947 births
Living people
Algerian male middle-distance runners
Olympic athletes of Algeria
Athletes (track and field) at the 1972 Summer Olympics
Athletes (track and field) at the 1971 Mediterranean Games
Mediterranean Games bronze medalists for Algeria
Mediterranean Games medalists in athletics
21st-century Algerian people
20th-century Algerian people